Saša is a South Slavic given name. It is a diminutive of Aleksandar (see Sasha), but in the South Slavic countries it is often a formal name as well. It may refer to:

Saša Antunović (born 1974), Serbian footballer
Saša Bjelanović (born 1979), Croatian footballer
Saša Bogunović (born 1982), Serbian footballer
Saša Čađo (born 1989), Serbian basketball player
Saša Cilinšek (born 1952), Serbian footballer
Saša Ćirić (born 1968), Macedonian footballer
Saša Ćurčić (born 1972), Serbian footballer
Saša Đorđević (footballer) (born 1981), Serbian footballer
Saša Dragin (born 1972), Serbian politician
Saša Drakulić (born 1972), Serbian footballer
Saša Gajser (born 1974), Slovenian footballer
Saša Gedeon (born 1970), Czech film director
Saša Hiršzon (born 1972), Yugoslavian/Croatian tennis player
Saša Ilić (footballer born 1972), Serbian-Australian football goalkeeper
Saša Ilić (footballer born 1977), Serbian footballer
Saša Ilić (Macedonian footballer) (born 1970), Macedonian footballer
Saša Imprić (born 1986), Croatian swimmer
Saša Ivanović (born 1984), Montenegrin footballer
Saša Ivetić (born 1982), Canadian Cyclist, Fisherman, and Architect
Saša Kajkut (born 1984), Bosnian footballer
Saša Kocić (born 1976), Serbian footballer
Saša Kovačević (footballer) (born 1973), Serbian footballer
Saša Lošić (born 1964), Bosnian musician
Saša Lozar (born 1980), Croatian musician
Saša Martinović (disambiguation), multiple people
Saša Matić (born 1978), Serbian musician
Saša Obradović (born 1969), Serbian basketball coach and former player
Saša Papac (born 1980), Bosnian footballer
Saša Peršon (born 1965), Croatian footballer
Saša Petricic (born 1963), Canadian journalist
Saša Radivojević (born 19790, Serbian footballer
Saša Ranić (born 1981), Slovenian footballer
Saša Simonović (born 1975), Serbian footballer
Saša Skenderija (born 1968), Bosnian-American poet
Saša Stamenković (born 1985), Serbian footballer
Saša Todić (born 1974), Serbian footballer
Saša Toperić (born 1972), Bosnian musician and diplomat
Saša Vasiljević (born 1979), Bosnian basketball player
Saša Viciknez (born 1974), Serbian footballer
Saša Vlaisavljević (born 1968), Serbian businessman

References

Bosnian masculine given names
Croatian masculine given names
Serbian masculine given names
Slavic masculine given names
Slovene feminine given names

ko:사샤